The 1949–50 season was Mansfield Town's 12th season in the Football League and eighth season in the Third Division North, they finished in 8th position with 48 points.

Final league table

Results

Football League Third Division North

FA Cup

Squad statistics
 Squad list sourced from

References
General
 Mansfield Town 1949–50 at soccerbase.com (use drop down list to select relevant season)

Specific

Mansfield Town F.C. seasons
Mansfield Town